"That Was a Close One" is a song written by Robert Byrne and recorded by American country music artist Earl Thomas Conley.  It was released in March 1987 as the third single from the album Too Many Times.  The song was Conley's thirteenth number one country hit.  The single went to number one for one week and spent a total of thirteen weeks on the country chart.

Charts

Weekly charts

Year-end charts

References
 

1987 singles
1986 songs
Earl Thomas Conley songs
Songs written by Robert Byrne (songwriter)
RCA Records singles
Song recordings produced by Mark Wright (record producer)